Antonio Sbordone (16 June 1932 – 5 December 2000) was an Italian diver. He competed in the men's 10 metre platform event at the 1960 Summer Olympics.

References

External links
 

1932 births
2000 deaths
Italian male divers
Olympic divers of Italy
Divers at the 1960 Summer Olympics
Divers from Naples